47 Andromedae is a binary star system in the northern constellation of Andromeda. The designation is from the star catalogue of John Flamsteed, first published in 1712. The system has a combined apparent visual magnitude of 5.60, which is just bright enough to be faintly visible to the naked eye under good seeing conditions. The distance to this system, as determined from an annual parallax shift of 15.9805 mas, is about 204 light years. It is moving away from the Sun with a heliocentric radial velocity of +13.3 km/s.

The binary nature of this system was discovered by John Stanley Plaskett and Reynold Kenneth Young in 1919 using radial velocity measurements taken from Photographic plates obtained at Dominion Astrophysical Observatory in Saanich, British Columbia, Canada. It is a double-lined spectroscopic binary with an orbital period of 35.4 days and an eccentricity of 0.65. The components appear to be nearly identical Am stars, with a magnitude difference of 0.05. The combined stellar classification is A1m.

References

Am stars
Spectroscopic binaries
Andromeda (constellation)
Durchmusterung objects
Andromedae, 47
008374
006514
0395
A-type main-sequence stars